Courant may refer to:

 Hexham Courant, a weekly newspaper in Northumberland, England
 The New-England Courant, an American newspaper, founded in Boston in 1721
 Hartford Courant, a newspaper in the United States, founded in 1764
Courant (surname)
Courant, Charente-Maritime, a commune in France
Courant, in heraldry, signifying a running animal with all four paws raised - see Attitude (heraldry)#Courant
 The Courant Institute of Mathematical Sciences at New York University
 Courant, an alternative spelling for the Baroque dance form, courante
 The Courant–Friedrichs–Lewy condition (CFL condition) in mathematics
 Richard Courant (1888–1972), German mathematician

See also
 Corante

ru:Курант